14th Regiment or 14th Infantry Regiment may refer to:

 2nd/14th Light Horse Regiment, a unit of the Australian Army
 14th Air Defence Artillery Regiment (Belgium), a unit of the Belgian Army
 14th Alpini Regiment, a unit of the Italian Army
14th Infantry Regiment (Philippine Army)
 14th Regiment Royal Artillery, a unit of the British Army
 14th (Buckinghamshire) Regiment of Foot, a unit of British Army
 14th Infantry Regiment (USAFIP-NL), a unit of the United States Armed Forces in the Philippines - Northern Luzon or USAFIP-NL
 14th Infantry Regiment (United States), a unit of the United States Army
 14th Armored Cavalry Regiment (United States), a unit of the United States Army
 14th Marine Regiment (United States), a unit of the United States Marine Corps

American Revolutionary War regiments

 14th Continental Regiment, a unit which fought for secession from the British Empire

American Civil War regiments

 14th Regiment Alabama Infantry, a unit of the Confederate (South) Army during the American Civil War
 14th Indiana Infantry Regiment, a unit of the Union (North) Army during the American Civil War
 14th Illinois Volunteer Infantry Regiment, a unit of the Union (North) Army during the American Civil War
 14th Regiment Illinois Volunteer Cavalry, a unit of the Union (North) Army during the American Civil War
 14th Iowa Volunteer Infantry Regiment, a unit of the Union (North) Army during the American Civil War
 14th Maine Volunteer Infantry Regiment, a unit of the Union (North) Army during the American Civil War
 14th Michigan Volunteer Infantry Regiment, a unit of the Union (North) Army during the American Civil War
 14th Michigan Volunteer Mounted Infantry Regiment, a unit of the Union (North) Army during the American Civil War
 14th Regiment (New York State Militia), a unit of the Union (North) Army during the American Civil War
 14th West Virginia Volunteer Infantry Regiment, a unit of the Union (North) Army during the American Civil War
 14th Wisconsin Volunteer Infantry Regiment, a unit of the Union (North) Army during the American Civil War

See also

 14th Brigade (disambiguation)
 14th Division (disambiguation)